The following lists events that happened during 1892 in Chile.

Incumbents
President of Chile: Jorge Montt

Events 
15 August - The Santiago Wanderers Football Club is established

Births
20 July - Juan Bascuñán (died 1969)

Deaths
13 June - Francisco Astaburuaga Cienfuegos (born 1817)

References

 
Years of the 19th century in Chile
Chile